Springton Manor Farm is a historic farm and national historic district located in Wallace Township, Chester County, Pennsylvania.   The farm has 14 contributing buildings, 1 contributing site, and 5 contributing structures.  They include the main house, a cistern (c. 1870), tool shed (c. 1850), privy (c. 1840), spring and milk house (c. 1836), carriage house (c. 1840, 1887), small barn (c. 1845), corn crib (c. 1845), bank barn (c. 1750), stone lean-to (c. 1711, 1745), the ruins of a stone spring house (c. 1735), and hydraulic dams (c. 1870).  The main house is in three sections; the earliest dates about 1836, with additions and modifications made in 1887 and 1912.  It is a 2 1/2-story, seven bay by two bay, stuccoed stone dwelling with Georgian and Queen Anne style design details.  Originally built by Joseph Muckleduff in the early 1700s.  Upon Joseph's death 9 Sep 1750, Springton Manor was left to his brother Samuel Muckleduff. [Chester Co PA Wills & Mention in Wills 1713 - 1825].  It was the home of Congressman Abraham Robinson McIlvaine (1804-1863).  The property is administered as a park and agricultural history museum by Chester County.

It was added to the National Register of Historic Places in 1979.

References

External links
Springton Manor Farm website

Open-air museums in Pennsylvania
Farms on the National Register of Historic Places in Pennsylvania
Historic districts on the National Register of Historic Places in Pennsylvania
Houses in Chester County, Pennsylvania
National Register of Historic Places in Chester County, Pennsylvania